The Yudoma-Maya Highlands are a mountainous area in the Sakha Republic and Khabarovsk Krai, Far Eastern Federal District, Russia.

The settlement of Allakh-Yun is located in the area of the highlands on the right bank of the Allakh-Yun River.

History
The area of the Yudoma-Maya and the Aldan highlands, between the basins of the Aldan River and the Yudoma, was uncharted territory well until the 1930s. It was first surveyed in 1934 by geologist Yuri Bilibin (1901—1952) together with mining engineer Evgeny Bobin (1897—1941) in the course of an expedition sent by the government of the USSR. Bilibin and Bobin made a thorough topographic survey of the mountainous regions leading separate research parties. They described the highlands as "a disordered jumble of round hills with soft outlines".

Geography
The Yudoma-Maya Highlands are located in the upper basin of the Maya River, a tributary of the Aldan River, at the southern end of the Sakha Republic and the western limits of Khabarovsk Krai. They are bound to the west by the Skalisty Range and the Sette-Daban subranges of the Verkhoyansk Range, and to the north by the Suntar-Khayata Range. The highlands reach the valley of the Okhota River to the east, and to the south they are limited by the northern end of the Dzhugdzhur Range.

Subranges and peaks
Northern section 
Kutelsky Range, highest point 
Uemlyakhskі Goltsi,   (Уемляхські Гольцы) 
Tarbaganakhskі Goltsi,   (Тарбаганахські Гольцы)
Southern section 
Chelat Range, highest point 
Upper Maya Massif, highest point 
Maya Massif, highest point

Climate
The highlands have a harsh continental climate. In summer the average July temperature in the valleys does not exceed . Most of the yearly precipitation falls in the second half of summer in the form of rain.

Flora
The areas adjacent to the valleys are covered with larch and pine forests, especially in the southern region. In the northern parts of the highlands there are thickets of dwarf cedar and mountain tundra above .

References

External links
First Sm-Nd data on Late Ordovician age of granitoids of the Verkhnyaya Maya Uplift, Okhotsk Massif

Mountain ranges of the Sakha Republic
Mountain ranges of Khabarovsk Krai